Mesosa longipennis is a species of beetle in the family Cerambycidae. It was described by Henry Walter Bates in 1873. It is known from Taiwan, Russia, South Korea, China, and Japan. It contains the varietas Mesosa longipennis var. subobliterata.

M. longipennis feeds on Ailanthus altissima.

References

longipennis
Beetles described in 1873